Rtiče (in older sources also Artiče, formerly Sveti Bric) is a settlement west of Podkum in the Municipality of Zagorje ob Savi in central Slovenia. The area is part of the traditional region of Lower Carniola. It is now included with the rest of the municipality in the Central Sava Statistical Region.

Church
The local church is dedicated to Saint Brice and belongs to the Parish of Šentjurij–Podkum. It dates to the 17th century.

References

External links
Rtiče on Geopedia

Populated places in the Municipality of Zagorje ob Savi